The Other Side is the fourth studio album by American country music artist Wynonna, released in 1997 on Curb Records in association with Universal Records. The album, which was certified gold by the RIAA, produced three chart singles on the Billboard Hot Country Singles and Tracks (now Hot Country Songs) charts: "When Love Starts Talkin'", "Come Some Rainy Day" and "Always Will" respectively reached #13, #14 and #45. A fourth single, "Love Like That", failed to chart. The album also includes "We Can't Unmake Love", a duet with John Berry, which was also included on Berry's 2000 Greatest Hits album.

Track listing

Personnel 
 Wynonna Judd – lead vocals 
 Matt Rollings – keyboards (2, 12), acoustic piano (3, 9, 10), Wurlitzer electric piano (5), Hammond B3 organ (6, 8, 9)
 Bobby Ogdin – keyboards (4)
 Billy Kirsch – acoustic piano (7)
 John Barlow Jarvis – keyboards (11)
 Steuart Smith – electric guitar (1, 2, 4, 5, 7, 8, 12), electric slide guitar (3), acoustic guitar (4, 12)
 Biff Watson – acoustic guitar (1-10, 12)
 Kenny Greenberg – electric guitar (3), dobro (3, 6)
 Kenny Wayne Shepherd – electric guitar (6)
 Dann Huff – acoustic guitar (9, 10), electric guitar (9, 10)
 David Pack – acoustic guitar (9), harmony vocals (10)
 Tom Hemby – 12-string acoustic guitar (10)
 Larry Byrom – acoustic guitar (11)
 Brent Mason – electric guitar (11)
 Al Perkins – lap steel guitar solo (9)
 Bruce Bouton – pedal steel guitar (9, 10)
 Paul Franklin – pedal steel guitar (11)
 Willie Weeks – bass (1-10)
 Michael Rhodes – bass (11, 12)
 Eddie Bayers – drums (1-5, 7-12), percussion (2), foot stomping (6), leg slaps (6)
 Tom Roady – percussion (1, 2, 3, 7)
 Terry McMillan – percussion (9, 10), washboard (9), screams (9)
 Cliff Downs – handclaps (9)
 Bridgett Evans O'Lannerghty – handclaps (9)
 Michael Omartian – handclaps (9)
 Aubrey Haynie – fiddle (11)
 Tammy Rogers – fiddle (12)
 Hunter Lee – Uilleann pipes (12)
 Bergen White – string arrangements (7)
 Carl Gorodetzky – string conductor (7)
 The Nashville String Machine – strings (7)
 Bob Bailey – backing vocals (1, 2, 4, 8, 12)
 Vicki Hampton – backing vocals (1-5, 8, 12), harmony vocals (9)
 Kim Fleming – backing vocals (2, 3, 4, 12)
 Brent Maher – backing vocals (5)
 Jack Sundrud – backing vocals (5)
 Naomi Judd – harmony vocals (6)
 Lisa Bevill – backing vocals (10)
 Chris Rodriguez – backing vocals (10)
 Nicol Sponberg – backing vocals (10)
 John Berry – lead vocals (11)

Production 
 Brent Maher – producer (1-8, 12), engineer (1-8, 12)
 David Pack – producer (9, 10)
 John Berry – producer (11)
 Billy Joe Walker Jr. – producer (11)
 Justin Niebank – engineer (9, 10)
 Steve Tillisch – engineer (11)
 John Guess – mixing (1-8, 12)
 Terry Christian – mixing (9, 10), overdub engineer (9, 10)
 Ron Reynolds – mixing (9, 10)
 Chuck Ainlay – mixing (10)
 Mills Logan – additional engineer (1-8, 12), assistant engineer (1-8, 12)
 Marty Williams – additional engineer (1-8, 12)
 Philip Scoggins – assistant engineer (1-8, 12)
 Paul Skaife – assistant engineer (1-8, 12)
 Steve Bishir – overdub engineer (9, 10)
 Dave Dillbeck – overdub engineer (9, 10)
 Jim Dineen – overdub engineer (9, 10)
 Brian Haehnel – overdub engineer (9, 10)
 Terry Nelson – overdub engineer (9, 10)
 David Thoener – overdub engineer (9, 10)
 Brian Hardin – assistant engineer (11)
 Ed Seay – assistant engineer (11), mixing (11)
 Christopher Rowe – mix assistant (1-8, 12)
 Tim Coyle – mix assistant (9, 10)
 Mark Ralston – mix assistant (9, 10)
 Dean Jamison – mix assistant (11)
 Don Cobb – digital editing 
 Carlos Grier – digital editing 
 Denny Purcell – mastering 
 Jan Greenfield – project coordinator (1-8, 12)
 Bridgett O'Lannerghty – project coordinator (9, 10)
 Ginny Johnson – project coordinator (11)
 Virginia Team – art direction
 Team Design – design 
 Davis Factor – photography 
 Larry Strickland – management

Studios
 Recorded at Ocean Way, Creative Recording, Masterfonics Tracking Room and Emerald Sound Studio (Nashville, TN).
 Overdubbed at Creative Recording, Moraine Recording, The Work Station, Sound Emporium, The Sound Shop and Quad Studios (Nashville, TN); The Bennett House, The Sound Kitchen, North Beach Studios and Tejas Recorders (Franklin, TN); Pack's Place and Andora Studios (Los Angeles, CA).
 Mixed at The Work Station, Emerald Sound Studio and The Sound Kitchen.
 Mastered at Georgetown Masters (Nashville, TN).

Charts

Weekly charts

Year-end charts

References

Allmusic (see infobox)

1997 albums
Wynonna Judd albums
Curb Records albums
Universal Records albums
Albums produced by Brent Maher